Dimsie Goes To School is the first of the Dimsie books by author Dorita Fairlie Bruce.  It was first published in 1921 under the title The Senior Prefect and changed in 1925 to Dimsie Goes To School. The book was illustrated by Wal Paget.

The protagonist of the book is ten-year-old Daphne Isabel Maitland, who is nicknamed Dimsie, on account of her initials.  The book begins with Dimsie travelling in a train and about to start school at the Jane Willard Foundation, where her older cousin (also Daphne) is a prefect.

The popularity of the continuing series led to Dimsie Goes to School being reprinted several more times by the OUP, and in the 1950s by Spring Books. The illustrations kept pace with changing fashions, as the following two illustrations of the same scene demonstrate. In the 1983 edition published by Goodchild changes were also made to the text to reflect changing social mores.

1921 British novels
British children's novels
Novels by Dorita Fairlie Bruce
Novels set in boarding schools
1921 children's books